Lela Rochon Fuqua (born April 17, 1964) is an American actress. She is best known for her starring role as Robin Stokes in the 1995 romantic drama film Waiting to Exhale. Rochon also had roles in the films Harlem Nights (1989), Boomerang (1992), The Chamber (1996), Gang Related (1997), Knock Off (1998), Why Do Fools Fall in Love (1998), and Any Given Sunday (1999).

Early life
Rochon was born in the Los Angeles suburb of Torrance, the daughter of Zelma, a nurse practitioner, and Samuel Staples, a business owner and graphic artist. She is a 1982 graduate of Cerritos High School in Cerritos, California. In 1986, she graduated from California State University, Dominguez Hills (CSUDH), where she earned a bachelor's degree in broadcast journalism, with minors in sociology and theatre. In 2016, Rochon returned to CSUDH as the keynote speaker at the commencement ceremonies for the College of Arts and Humanities.

Career

Early works
In 1984, Rochon appeared as an extra in the movie Breakin’, where she met the man who would later become her husband. From 1986 to 1988, while attending college, Rochon was one of the "Spudettes" featured in over 30 national spots for the Spuds MacKenzie Budweiser/Bud Light TV commercials. She also appeared in the 1985 made-for-television film A Bunny's Tale starring Kirstie Alley and Delta Burke, based on Gloria Steinem's experiences as a Playboy Bunny. She appeared as the love interest of Gerald Levert in the video for "My Forever Love" by Levert, and in Luther Vandross' "It's Over Now" video. She also appeared in the music video for Lionel Richie's single "All Night Long (All Night)",  in Al B. Sure's video for the song "Natalie", and in Tupac Shakur's video "I Get Around" as one of the female dancers. She had many guest starring roles in a number of sitcoms, include The Cosby Show, Amen, 227, The Fresh Prince of Bel-Air, and Hangin' with Mr. Cooper. Rochon made her film debut in 1985, when she starred opposite Fred Williamson in Fox Trap. In 1987, she played the role of Debby in the film The Wild Pair, starring Beau Bridges and Bubba Smith. In 1989, Rochon acted opposite Eddie Murphy in 1989's Harlem Nights, as the memorable "Sunshine" character. She again worked with Murphy in the successful 1992 romantic comedy, Boomerang. In 1995, she was regular cast member during the first season of The WB sitcom, The Wayans Bros.

Breakthrough

In 1995, Rochon landed one of the lead roles opposite Whitney Houston, Angela Bassett and Loretta Devine in the adaptation of the Terry McMillan novel and highly successful drama film Waiting to Exhale. She played the character Robin Stokes, for which she was nominated for an MTV Movie Award for Best Breakthrough Performance and NAACP Image Award for Outstanding Supporting Actress in a Motion Picture. 
In 1996, Rochon starred opposite Timothy Hutton in the Showtime cable network film Mr. and Mrs. Loving, receiving a Cable Ace Award nomination for Best Actress. Later that year, she played the female lead in the  crime thriller film The Chamber. The following year, she starred alongside Jim Belushi and Tupac Shakur in the crime thriller Gang Related. In 1998, Rochon had the leading role alongside Halle Berry and Vivica A. Fox in the romantic drama Why Do Fools Fall in Love, and well starred in Knock Off with Jean-Claude Van Damme, and The Big Hit, as love interest to Mark Wahlberg's leading character. In 1999, she appeared in Any Given Sunday directed by Oliver Stone. In 2001, Rochon made her return to television with one of leading roles alongside Bonnie Bedelia, Nancy McKeon, Tracey Needham, and Lisa Vidal in the Lifetime crime drama series, The Division. She left the series after a single season.

2000s-present
In 2004, Rochon co-starred opposite Katie Holmes in the romantic comedy film First Daughter. In 2009, she had cameo in crime drama Brooklyn's Finest directed by her husband, Antoine Fuqua. In 2013, she played one of leading roles in Regina King's directorial debut Let The Church Say Amen, the film adaptation of ReShonda Tate Billingsley's 2005 novel for BET. She later had roles in films Supremacy (2014) with Danny Glover and Derek Luke, and Reversion (2015), playing Aja Naomi King's character's mother. In 2017, she had a recurring role in the CBS crime drama series Training Day, and in 2019 on the Oprah Winfrey Network drama David Makes Man.

Personal life
Rochon has been married twice and has two children. Her first marriage was to dancer and actor Adolfo Quiñones, better known as Shabba Doo, from 1982 until divorcing in 1987. In 1999, she married film director Antoine Fuqua. Together, they have two children; Asia Rochon Fuqua and Brando. Rochon suffered a miscarriage in 2001.

Filmography

Film

Television

Awards and nominations

References

External links

1964 births
American film actresses
African-American actresses
American television actresses
Living people
Actresses from Little Rock, Arkansas
Actresses from Los Angeles
20th-century American actresses
21st-century American actresses
20th-century African-American women
20th-century African-American people
21st-century African-American women
21st-century African-American people